Brass Knuckles is an electronic dance music trio originating from Miami, consisting of Danny D'Brito, Tony Livadas, and Anthony Pisano.

Musical career

Formation 

Danny and Tony originally played together in a band in the early 2000s before connecting with Anthony in 2009.

2008-2012 

After producing music together for two years, including two song placements on Jagged Edge’s album which featured Rick Ross, they finally came together and created Brass Knuckles in 2010.

In 2011, the group released their single "Lie to You" on Nervous Records. Global touring followed the release, bringing them to Asia and Europe. This leg of touring included a variety of dates in Croatia, as well as an opening set in front of 10,000 people supporting genre legend Fatboy Slim.

In 2012, having attracted attention of major labels, they signed with Ultra Records and released their first single with them, "Bad Habits".  "Bad Habits" peaked at #27 on Billboard Club Play Charts and #45 on Billboard Dance Charts, and was featured on Ultra Music 14 and Ultra/Wynn Presents XS Las Vegas Sessions: Vol. 2. At Ultra Music Festival 2013, well-known electronic groups Knife Party, Krewella and Adventure Club played “Bad Habits” in their live DJ sets in Miami; Knife Party playing it both weekends.

The music video for "Bad Habits", released in November 2012, sparked debate, as it included footage dealing with heavier issues such as drug usage and extreme violence. Vibe interviewed the trio later on, and revealed the background story behind the true message of the video.

2013-present 
Early in 2013, Brass Knuckles released "Hurricane", an additional Beatport exclusive peaking at No. 24 on the Electro/House Charts. Their next single "As Long As I’m Alive" and debut EP will be released on Ultra, due out in summer 2013.

2013 had already seen a good number of music festivals for the DJ trio, including SXSW, Life In Color, Sunset Music Festival, and Ultra Europe. This will also be the third year in a row that their increasingly popular original party series "The Electrik Circus" will be held in Miami.

Discography

Singles 

 "Closure" (Brass Knuckles & David Solano) (2010)
 "Lie To You" (2011)
 "Bad Habits" (2012) #45 on Billboard Dance Charts and #27 on Billboard Club Play Charts
 Remixed by:
 DJ BL3ND
 DotExe
 David Solano and Leewise 
 Joe Maz of Discotech
 Twinz Beatz
 The Renegades
 "Hurricane" (Feat. Emir Duru) (2013) #24 on Beatport House Electro Tracks
 "As Long As I'm Alive" (Feat. John Ryan) (2013)
 Remixed by:
 Starkillers
 Greg Cerrone

Upcoming releases 

 "More Than One" (Feat. Kay) (2013)
 "Its Too Late" (Feat. Hayley Gene) (2013)
 "Sun Was Shining" (Feat. Jody Brock) (2013)

Remixes 

 Cee Lo Green – "F*** You"
 Gotye – "Somebody That I Used To Know"
 Jason Derulo – "Other Side"
 Kimbra – "Posse"
 Le Youth – "Cool"
 Mt. Eden – "Airwalker"
 Carly Rae Jepsen - "This Kiss"
 Genesis – "Land of Confusion"

References

External links 
 Brass Knuckles' Official Website
 Brass Knuckles on Facebook
 Brass Knuckles on Twitter
 Brass Knuckles' channel on YouTube
 Brass Knuckles - Croatia Tour Recap 6.31.2011 - 7.11.2011
 Ultra Dance 14 Cover Girl Photo Shoot - Behind the Scenes

American dance music groups
American musical trios
Musical groups established in 2008